Nagyatádi Futball Club is a professional football club based in Nagyatád, Somogy County, Hungary. The club competes in the Somogy county league.

Name changes
1926–?: Nagyatádi Turul Sport Egyesület
?-1945: Nagyatádi Levente SE
1945–1946: Nagyatádi MSE
1946-147: Nagyatádi KTE
1947–1951: Nagyatádi Munkás TE
1951–1957: Nagyatádi Vörös Lobogó SK
1957–1966: Nagyatádi Kinizsi SK
1966: the football department became defunct
1967: takeover by Nagyatádi MTE 
1966–1967: Nagyatádi Munkás TE
1967: merger with Nagyatádi Konzervgyár SE
1967–1970: Nagyatádi Konzervgyár SE
1970–1980: Nagyatádi Kinizsi
1980–1998: Nagyatádi Városi SE
1998–present: Nagyatádi Futball Club

Honours
Nemzeti Bajnokság III:
Runners-up: 2009–10
Nemzeti Bajnokság III:
Third: 2001–02, 2002–03

External links
 Profile on Magyar Futball

References

Football clubs in Hungary
Association football clubs established in 1926
1926 establishments in Hungary